Herbert Brunken (born 1896, date of death unknown) was an American poet, and magazine editor.

Life
He lived in Wisconsin.

He sent contributions for the Smart Set to H. L. Menken.

He was editor of Minaret magazine in Washington, D. C., from 1911 to 1926, with Shaemus O. Sheele, and Harold Hersey.

Awards
 1939/1940 Shelley Memorial Award

Works

Poetry
 
 
 
 
 
 Noise in Time. Prairie City, Ill.: Decker Press. 1949.

Non-fiction
 Subject Index to Poetry, Chicago, ALA, 1940.

References

1896 births
Year of death missing
American magazine publishers (people)